The Champ is a Sonny Stitt album recorded at RCA's Studio B on April 18, 1973 and released on the Muse label.

Track listing

Side 1
 "The Champ" (Gillespie) – 8:48
 "Sweet and Lovely" (Arnheim, Tobias, Lemare) – 7:11
 "The Midgets" (Newman) – 5:36

Side 2
 "The Eternal Triangle" (Stitt) – 5:21
 "All the Things You Are" (Kern-Hammerstein) – 4:32
 "Walkin'" (Carpenter) – 9:43
 Note that on Side 1 Track 2 time is not 6:12 as listed on the label of the vinyl disc.

Personnel
 Sonny Stitt – alto & tenor saxophone
 Joe Newman – trumpet
 Duke Jordan – piano
 Sam Jones – bass
 Roy Brooks – drums

Production
 Producer: Don Schlitten
 Engineers: Paul Goodman

References

External links
 Sonny Stitt The Champ at My Jazz World blogspot

Sonny Stitt albums
1973 albums
Muse Records albums
Albums produced by Don Schlitten